Kane Allen Brown (born October 21, 1993) is an American singer. Brown first came to the attention of the public through social media. He released his first EP, titled Closer, in June 2015, and followed it with a new single, "Used to Love You Sober", in October 2015. After Brown signed with RCA Nashville in early 2016, the song was included on his EP Chapter 1, released in March 2016. He released his first full-length album, the self-titled Kane Brown, on December 2, 2016. The single "What Ifs" came from this album, and in October 2017, Brown became the first artist to have simultaneous number ones on all five main Billboard country charts. Brown released his second album, Experiment, in November 2018, which became his first number one album on the Billboard 200.

Early life
Brown was raised in rural northwest Georgia and in the Chattanooga, Tennessee, area. He is multiracial, with a white mother, Tabatha Brown, and an African-American father who is also part Cherokee. In 2018, he told People magazine he did not know he was biracial until he was 7 or 8 years old: "I thought I was full white... I found out that I was biracial, and I still wasn't thinking anything of it, but then I started getting called the N-word ... I learned what it meant, and that's when it started affecting me. I got in fights over it when I was little." His father has been incarcerated since 1996, and he was raised by his single mother.

Sometimes homeless, his family moved around northwest Georgia when he was younger from Rossville to Fort Oglethorpe to LaFayette before finally settling in Red Bank, Tennessee. As a result, he attended many schools, among them Lakeview Fort Oglethorpe High School in Fort Oglethorpe, where he sang in the choir with Lauren Alaina, the runner-up on Season 10 of American Idol. He also attended Red Bank, Ridgeland, and Soddy Daisy High Schools. After graduation, he lived with his grandmother, who had also helped raise him.

Brown grew up listening to country music but became interested in R&B music in middle school. However, after almost winning a school talent show in 11th grade with a rendition of Chris Young's "Gettin' You Home", he began to perform country music. He auditioned for both American Idol and The X Factor after the success of his school friend Lauren Alaina on American Idol. He was chosen for The X Factor after an audition in 2013 but left the show when its producers wanted to include him in a boy band. After that, he decided to post his cover versions of popular songs online.

Career
In 2014, Kane Brown began posting videos of his covers of songs by Brantley Gilbert, Billy Currington, Alan Jackson, and other singers on social media. He acquired a following for his homemade videos on Facebook. His cover of Lee Brice's "I Don't Dance" was one early video that gained wide attention. Released on September 30, 2015, his cover of George Strait's "Check Yes or No" went viral and received more than seven million views. His number of followers on Facebook quickly reached more than a million, leading to a teaser clip for his own single "Used to Love You Sober" hitting one million views in less than three hours upon its release on October 8, 2015, and then reaching more than 11 million views in two weeks.

Brown was initially signed to Zone 4 with Jay Frank as his first manager. Martha Earls became his manager in 2016.

2014: Closer
In 2014, Brown raised funds via crowdfunding site Kickstarter to produce a six-song EP, which he recorded in Nashville, Tennessee, at the home studio of Noah Henson, guitarist for Brantley Gilbert. The EP, titled Closer, was released on June 2, 2015, and debuted on the Top Country Albums chart at number 22, selling 3,200 copies in its debut week. A single from the EP, "Don't Go City on Me", was first released on October 22, 2014, and reached number 43 on the Country Digital Songs chart.

2015: "Used to Love You Sober" and follow-up singles
Brown released a new single "Used to Love You Sober" on his birthday (October 21) in 2015, and the song was spotlighted on Zane Lowe's Beats 1. It reached number two on the Country Digital Songs chart based on just two days of sales, with 38,000 copies sold. The release of the single also pushed his EP Closer up the chart to number 22 on the Top Album Sales chart. A second song, "Last Minute Late Night", was released on November 4, 2015, and debuted on the Country Digital Songs chart at number nine, with 26,000 copies sold. Another single, "I Love That I Hate You", followed three weeks later on November 30, 2015, and sold 17,000 copies in the first week.

2016–2018: Chapter 1 and Kane Brown
Brown opened for Florida Georgia Line on their summer 2016 Dig Your Roots Tour and collaborated with Chandler Stephens on a song they wrote together, "Can't Stop Love", which released on February 12, 2016.

He signed with Sony Music Nashville on January 27, 2016, and records under the RCA Nashville label. His first EP under the label, titled Chapter 1, released on March 18, 2016. It includes the singles "Used to Love You Sober" and "Last Minute Late Night" and debuted at number nine on the U.S. Billboard 200 and at number three on the Top Country Albums chart, selling 30,000 units (23,000 in traditional albums) in its first week.

On June 17, 2016, "Ain't No Stopping Us Now" was released as a promotional single ahead of his debut full-length album. "Thunder in the Rain" was released as the debut radio single from the album on August 3, 2016, and Brown headlined his own Ain't No Stopping Us Now Tour produced by Monster Energy and Outbreak Presents starting on November 3, 2016. The self-titled album featuring those songs was released on December 2, 2016, and debuted at number 10 on the U.S. Billboard 200. "What Ifs", recorded with his friend Lauren Alaina, was released as the second single from the album and has been certified 5× Platinum by the RIAA. It became a number one hit on the Billboard Country Airplay charts for the week of October 28, 2017, the first for Brown and the second for Alaina. It also spent five weeks at number one on the Billboard Hot Country Songs chart.

An expanded deluxe edition of Brown's debut album was released October 6, 2017, featuring four new tracks, including a duet with Chris Young and "Heaven", released as the album's third single on November 13, 2017. Upon the release of the deluxe edition, the album went to number five on the Billboard 200 and returned to number one on the Top Country Albums chart. With the single "What Ifs", which reached number one on multiple charts, and the new song "Heaven" released with the deluxe edition, Brown became the first artist to have simultaneous number ones on all five main country charts: Top Country Albums, Hot Country Songs, Country Airplay, Country Digital Song Sales, and Country Streaming Songs.

2018–2019: Experiment and collaborations
On June 7, 2018, RCA Nashville released "Lose It" as the lead single for his second RCA album. A second track from the album, "Weekend", was released on August 8, 2018. On September 4, 2018, Brown announced the album's title, Experiment, via Twitter along with its cover art and news of the upcoming track "Homesick". Experiment was released on November 9, 2018 and became Brown's first No. 1 on the Billboard 200 albums chart.

Over the course of 2018–19, Brown released several collaborations with artists such as Becky G, Camila Cabello, and Digital Farm Animals, including a remix of "Saturday Nights" with R&B singer Khalid which was released as a single. He also appeared on Brooks & Dunn's album Reboot in a new rendition of their past hit "Believe". In August 2019, Brown collaborated with Marshmello for "One Thing Right", his first release to Mainstream Pop Radio.

In October 2019, Brown's drummer, Kenny Dixon, died in a car accident.

2020–present: Mixtape, Vol. 1 and Different Man
In April 2020, Brown released the track "Cool Again", the debut single off his upcoming third EP.

In June 2020, Brown released the song "Worldwide Beautiful", which aims to highlight peace and equality and benefits the Boys & Girls Club of America. In July 2020, Brown released his second single to pop radio, "Be Like That" with Khalid and Swae Lee, another single off his EP.

On August 14, 2020, Brown released his third EP, Mixtape, Vol. 1, which includes "Cool Again", "Worldwide Beautiful", and "Be Like That", as well as four other tracks.

In September 2020, Brown announced a drive-in concert, held at more than 200 theaters across the U.S. on September 26, 2020. That same week Brown appeared on stage at the iHeartRadio Music Festival in a PORTL "hologram" machine to sing "Be Like That" live from Nashville with Swae Lee and Khalid who were in the studio in Los Angeles, California.

In October 2020, "Worship You" was sent to country radio as his second official single to that format off the EP.

On November 26, 2020, Brown performed in a pre-recorded halftime show in the Thanksgiving Thursday Night Football game between the Washington Football Team and the Dallas Cowboys at AT&T Stadium.

On February 11, 2021, Brown launched his own label, 1021 Entertainment, in association with Sony Nashville.

Also in 2021, Brown became the first black person to win Video of the Year at the ACM Awards, which he won for "Worldwide Beautiful". He was included in 2021's Time 100, Times annual list of the 100 most influential people in the world.

On March 3, 2022, Brown released the song "Leave You Alone", which he initially previewed on social media in late 2021.

Brown announced his third studio album, Different Man, on July 18, 2022. The album was released on September 9, 2022.

Personal life
Brown is married to Katelyn Jae, who is also a singer. He proposed to her on Easter Sunday in 2017 and announced their engagement during a concert in Philadelphia, Pennsylvania, a short time later in April 2017. They were married at Mint Springs Farm in Nolensville, Tennessee, on October 12, 2018, with about 200 relatives and friends in attendance. On April 15, 2019, Brown announced they were expecting their first child. Less than a month later, on May 1, 2019, he revealed the baby was a girl during a walk down the red carpet at the Billboard Music Awards. On October 29, 2019, Jae gave birth to their daughter. On December 31, 2021, Brown announced that Jae had given birth to their second daughter a day prior.

Tours
The Worldwide Beautiful Tour (2020–2021)
Blessed & Free Tour (2021–2022)

Discography

Kane Brown (2016)
Experiment (2018)
Different Man (2022)

Awards and nominations

Filmography

References

External links

 

American country singer-songwriters
American male singer-songwriters
American Idol participants
Country musicians from Tennessee
Country pop musicians
21st-century African-American male singers
Living people
1993 births
Singer-songwriters from Tennessee
People from Red Bank, Tennessee
RCA Records Nashville artists
African-American country musicians
Country musicians from Georgia (U.S. state)
American people of Cherokee descent
The X Factor (American TV series) contestants
African-American songwriters